I Made Wirawan (born 1 December 1981 in Gianyar) is an Indonesian professional footballer who plays as a goalkeeper for Liga 1 club Persib Bandung.

Personal life 
Wirawan is married to Rucika Kalra, and the couple have one boy named Putu Ranwir Abhinava who was born on July 16, 2013 in Bandung. He is a practicing Hindu.

International career
His first cap for Indonesia was in a friendly match at Shah Alam Stadium, Shah Alam against Saudi Arabia on October 7, 2011.

Career statistics

International

Honours

Club
Persib Bandung
 Indonesia Super League: 2014
 Indonesia President's Cup: 2015
Individual
FWP Award 2019: Player Of The Year'''

References

External links
 

1981 births
Living people
Balinese people
Indonesian Hindus
People from Gianyar Regency
Sportspeople from Bali
Indonesian footballers
Indonesia international footballers
Perseden Denpasar players
Persiba Balikpapan players
Persib Bandung players
Liga 1 (Indonesia) players
Association football goalkeepers
Indonesian Super League-winning players